BraveStarr is an American space Western animated series that aired 65 episodes from September 1987 to February 1988 in syndication. The show was created a year after Mattel had released a line of action figures. BraveStarr was the last animated series produced by Filmation and Group W Productions before Filmation shut down in 1989. Reruns of the show aired on Qubo Night Owl from 2010 to 2013, and on the Retro Television Network from 2010 to 2015.

Background
The idea for BraveStarr began with Tex Hex, his chief adversary. Tex Hex was created by Filmation's staff artists in 1984, during the development of Filmation's Ghostbusters. Lou Scheimer found the character fascinating and pulled Tex Hex from the Ghostbusters cast. He asked Arthur Nadel, Filmation's Vice President for Creative Affairs, and art director John Grusd to develop a science fiction Western around the character. As the concepts took shape, staff writer Bob Forward fleshed out the writer's guide and eventually co-wrote the feature film script for BraveStarr: The Legend with writer Steve Hayes.

The series cost $20 million.

Plot
The episodes combine elements of science fiction and western genres. It is set in the 23rd century on a multi-cultural desert planet called New Texas.

As on other Filmation series (He-Man and the Masters of the Universe, She-Ra: Princess of Power, Shazam!, The Secret of Isis, and the animated Ghostbusters), a moral lesson is told at the end of each episode. One notable episode is "The Price", in which a boy buys a drug called "Spin", becomes addicted to it, and dies of an overdose.

Setting

The setting in most episodes is New Texas: a planetary system orbiting three suns, 600 parsecs (1957 light-years) from Earth. Much of the food and water supply is imported. The majority of land is desert or prairie but there is one wetland area, which is the home of "apecats". Water is also found in cactus-like 'Aqua-Pod' plants. The chief export is Kerium, a red mineral used as a fuel source, and often therefore the prize of conflicts among characters. Implications exist that New Texas was colonized for Kerium, but will remain inhabited even after the mines are exhausted. The native civilization of New Texas are the Prairie People, who operate most of the Kerium mines.

Points of interest
The following locations are on New Texas:

 Fort Kerium - A mechanized town capable of armoring itself; BraveStarr's base of operation.
 Starr Peak - A mountain where Shaman lives, concealing the spacecraft in which he arrived on New Texas, atop a Kerium deposit.
 Stone Canyon - A large mining canyon. Also the location of some crime.
 Peaceful Valley - A large agrarian land.
 The Hexagon - Fortress for most of the villains.
 The Badlands - The inhospitable land surrounding the Hexagon.

Two episodes are set on Earth, where the city of London resembles a modernized Victorian England, including a time-traveling Sherlock Holmes.

Alien and human species
 Apecats - Gigantic non-humanoid felines who live near the only wetlands on New Texas.
 Avianoid - The two-headed criminal Two Face comes from an avianoid species, and had half of his body augmented with cybernetic replacements (for reasons unknown), making him a cyborg. Another avianoid is the 'Cygnian Ambassador', who resembles an ostrich.
 Broncosaurs - A Dinosaur-like civilization of which Stampede is the last living representative.
 Dingos (a.k.a. Coyotoids) - Coyote-like humanoids, who often appear as minor antagonists, amenable to a peaceful lifestyle.
 Equestroids - Cyborg equines capable of assuming human attributes (bipedal stance and prehensile forelimbs especially) at will. Thirty/Thirty is the only survivor of this colony.
 Fuufta - Pacifist sheep-like creatures, often targeted by enemy civilizations.
 Humans - A variety of ethnic groups including Native Americans BraveStarr and Shaman, and the British Sherlock Holmes.
 Krang - Cat-like humanoids; warlike and therefore opposed to BraveStarr and his ideals.
 Porcinoid - Hawgtie comes from a porcine (pig-like) humanoid species.
 Prairie People - Anthropoid prairie dog-like creatures and native to New Texas who take pleasure in mining and in the operation of machines.
 Reptillianoid - Antagonists Vipra and Diamond Back are both reptilian and humanoid, and display behaviors of both.
 Rigellian - Drink-seller Handlebar is a member of this race of green-skinned humanoids with bright orange hair and superhuman strength. Dr. Wt'sn is also of this species.
 Sand Walrus - Antagonist Sand Storm comes from this red-skinned humanoid species and has a number of special powers.
 Solacows - A non-sentient cattle-like species, the raising of which is one of the few major non-mining-related industries on New Texas; disputes between Solacow ranchers and Kerium miners are not uncommon and have on occasion resulted in physical altercations.

Characters

Heroes

 Marshal BraveStarr (voiced by Pat Fraley) - The title character and galactic marshal of New Texas; a Native American who can call upon the power of "spirit animals", enabling him briefly to perform superhuman feats. The Eyes of the Hawk enhances his vision and can also grant him an aerial view of the adjacent area. The Ears of the Wolf gives him super-human hearing. The Strength of the Bear gives him super-human strength. The Speed of the Puma gives him super-human speed. The Strength of the Bear grants BraveStarr strength sufficient to destroy stone or support steel bridges, whereas the Speed of the Puma allows him speeds akin to comic-book characters Quicksilver and the Flash. In addition to his animal powers, he has electronic equipment such as a computerized visor and a two-way radio. BraveStarr also carries a "Neutra-laser" pistol, a high-tech hatchet, a beam lasso and a "Trans-freezer" rifle, and the badge on his shirt can shield him at need. Although called "Protector of Peace" and "Champion of Justice", he usually acts in the former role, preferring to serve as a mediator in any conflict. He often seeks peaceful resolution to every problem, unless confronted by the series' periodic villains.

 Thirty/Thirty (voiced by Ed Gilbert) - BraveStarr's Equestroid and chief deputy, capable of assuming a bipedal form at will. BraveStarr affectionately calls him "big partner". His principal weapon is "Sara Jane": a large blunderbuss from which he projects directed energy. He is more belligerent than BraveStarr, and will often prefer fights to resolutions. His appearance later inspired an alternative design for the character of Sylvia in the Wander Over Yonder episode "The Cartoon."

 Deputy Fuzz (voiced by Charlie Adler) - A member of the Prairie People and BraveStarr's other trusted deputy. BraveStarr affectionately calls him "li'l partner". Fuzz is typically a figure of comic relief, but also plays more-serious roles at need. The first of the Prairie People to befriend humans.

 Judge J.B. McBride (voiced by Susan Blu) - Fort Kerium's principal (and perhaps only) judge and lawyer, BraveStarr's ally, consultant, and occasional paramour. In battle, she uses an electronic gavel (called a "hammer of justice" in the series) given to her by the Prairie People.

 Shaman (voiced by Ed Gilbert) - An otherwise-unnamed mystic, capable of teleportation, time travel, psychokinesis, and near-omniscient clairvoyance. He is BraveStarr's mentor and foster-father. BraveStarr would often telepathically contact Shaman for advice on how to handle certain situations.

Supporting characters
 Angus McBride (voiced by Ed Gilbert) - The father of Judge J. B. McBride. He is a former Kerium prospector who now operates Fort Kerium's newspaper.

 Billy-Bob (voiced by Ed Gilbert) - A human Kerium prospector.

 Commander Karen Kane (voiced by Susan Blu) - A former Star Marine who retired after marrying Angus McBride. She is the stepmother of J. B. Like Angus, she has a Scottish accent.

 Diamondback (voiced by Alan Oppenheimer) - A Reptillianoid Kerium prospector, who owns the Kerium deposit underneath Starr Peak along with his human colleague Billy-Bob.

 Doc Clayton (voiced by Lou Scheimer) - The town's doctor who is frequently an ally of BraveStarr's.

 Handlebar (voiced by Alan Oppenheimer) - A Rigellian bartender and former space pirate from the Rigel star system, with a bright orange handlebar mustache and a Brooklyn accent. He mostly serves BraveStarr and Thirty/Thirty a drink called "sweetwater". Other times he acts as a reserve law enforcement officer. He has a pet cyborg steer named Rampage.

 Long Arm John - A law enforcement officer with a sophisticated prosthetic arm.

 Molly (voiced by Susan Blu) - Courier aboard a "Strato-Stage," a mechanized stagecoach traveling above ground. Occasionally, Molly has a security guard to blast away enemies. Molly is also capable of piloting space vehicles.

 Mayor Derringer (voiced by Pat Fraley) - The town leader of Fort Kerium who occasionally aides BraveStarr. Although he rarely uses it, he carries a stun pistol for protection.

 Wild Child (voiced by Erika Scheimer) - A baby who wandered into the desert and got adopted by Dingoes. He grew up among them until he met BraveStarr and Judge J.B. McBride.

 Zarko (voiced by Charlie Adler in "Wild Child," Ed Gilbert in "Call of the Wild") - The last living member of the Old Ones who hunted anyone that trespassed into the Lost City. After he helped save Wild Child, Zarko gives up hunting an adopts Wild Child.

 Orville (voiced by Susan Blu) - A new arrival to New Texas and Fort Kerium singled out for his stutter in "Brothers in Crime" he was kidnapped by two thieves Craver and Grumble during which he befriended the mentally slow Grumble and convinced Grumble to turn on Craver.  

 Brad (voiced by Susan Blu) - One of Fort Kerium local school kids who was a close friend to Jay Olman and who turned in Dealer after Jay died

 Brian (voiced by Pat Fraley) - One of Fort Kerium local school kids nicknamed "Gappie" who is friends with Judy and Clorg and whom regularly teases Wild Child

Villains
 Stampede (voiced by Alan Oppenheimer) - Chief antagonist and ringleader of the outlaws based at the Hexagon. A monstrous, partly skeletal Broncosaur and apparently the last of his kind. He seldom appears in battle directly, but is usually the source of his subordinates' evil plans. Stampede is the archenemy of BraveStarr's mentor Shaman.

 Carrion Bunch - An outlaw gang that reside in the Badlands at the Hexagon.
 Tex Hex (voiced by Charlie Adler) - BraveStarr's rival, opponent, and counterpart, distinguished by a withered appearance and lavender skin. He is Stampede's junior partner. Tex Hex originally Tex, a greedy Kerium prospector who briefly co-owned a Kerium mine with Angus. He crashed a Kerium-overloaded ship while heading home from New Texas and was revived and given a host of magical powers by Stampede. Credited, in the feature-film, with the discovery of Kerium on New Texas.
 Outlaw Skuzz (voiced by Alan Oppenheimer) - Tex's cigar-smoking henchman. A cousin of Deputy Fuzz; apparently the only Prairie Person to practice crime. The moral lesson at the end of one episode had him saying he liked being an outlaw, but the one bad thing he disliked doing was smoking and warning viewers not to follow his example.
 Cactus Head (voiced by Pat Fraley) - A short robot with a cactus-shaped headpiece equipped with two energy cannons. Often seen as the comic relief and used as a spy.
 Sand Storm (voiced by Ed Gilbert) - A red Sand snake like creature who can exhale giant clouds of sand. His kind are sometimes called "sand walruses" and are native to New Texas. He can also use his sand to put people to sleep or create sand creatures.
 Thunder Stick (voiced by Pat Fraley) - A stuttering robot with a directed-energy cannon built into his arm.
 Vipra (voiced by Susan Blu) - A Reptillianoid female villain who has the power to hypnotize people. She is the assistant to Tex Hex, but envious of his high rank among the villains.

 Billy the Droid - A purple robot with the power to shoot energy bolts from his hands and a gripping arm from his chest.

 Dealer - A Dingo drug dealer who was selling a drug called Spin that later killed a boy named Jay Olman. After his plot was foiled by testimony from Brad, the Dealer was arrested by BraveStarr.

 Dune Buggy Gang - A gang residing in the Badlands that causes trouble for travelers.
 Ryder (voiced by Alan Oppenheimer) - A cyborg human who is the leader of the Dune Buggy Gang.
 Slither (voiced by Charlie Adler) - A Reptilianoid.
 "Two Faced" Dingo Dan (Ed Gilbert) - One of Tex's Dingoes with a notionally Aussie accent. Dan has the ability to take on a human appearance, but would often forget to change his distinctive "fancy hat".

 Jingles Morgan - A former teacher of BraveStarr who hated so much to lose that he went rogue after fatally shooting his opponent Imperial Guard Trooper Salaman Bliss for mocking Morgan during a humiliating defeat.

 Krang - Humanoid felines with green armor and German accents; a periodic enemy.

 Leaper Riders - A group of Dingoes that ride Leapers.
 Goldtooth - An overweight coyote that usually leads other Dingoes in the battle.
 Barker (voiced by Lou Scheimer) - A little Dingo.
 Howler (voiced by Lou Scheimer) - Another coyote. He can assume human form.

 Hawgtie (voiced by Lou Scheimer) - A humanoid pig dressed in a Union Army uniform. He seemed to be strong, and used bolas to capture or bind his victims.

 Queen Singlish - A woman that commandeered an entire island, which floats through space. She constantly wants slaves to assist her; but is defeated by the Prairie People.

 Two-Face - A cyborg Avianoid with a normal head and a cyborg head.

 Craver - (voiced by Charlie Adler) - A mutant Dingo with the power to fly, he used Grumble to rob miners. He was captured by BraveStarr after Grumble finally realized his friend was using him

 Grumble - (voiced by Lou Scheimer) - A slow witted by superhumanly strong being who was Craver's partner until a boy they captured called Orville convinced him he was being used by his so called friend Craver

Episodes

Action figures and other merchandise
In 1986, a year before the TV series premiered, Mattel released an action figure line based on the Filmation cartoon series. These figures were large for the time at nearly 8" tall and came in a windowed box with artwork similar to that of their Masters of the Universe contemporaries. Each figure had a unique action feature and was packaged with one or more Kerium nuggets. Marshal BraveStarr and Tex Hex were also packaged with a Laser Fire Backpack which shot infrared beams and had "space-age" sound effects. Such backpacks were individually available – blue for heroes and black for villains. Other figures available were Handlebar, Sandstorm, Thirty/Thirty, Skuzz, Fuzz, Col. Borobot and Thunderstick. The Neutra-Laser weapon, which worked with the infrared technology, and Fort Kerium playset also made their way to toy shelves. A second series of figures was designed but never produced. This included Dingo Dan, Judge J. B., Long Arm John, Rampage, and the Starr Hawk vehicle.

Various other forms of BraveStarr merchandise made their way to the market including a Colorforms Adventure Set, View-Master reels, Ladybird storybook, pillow case, sticker album, and water gun, among others. A comic book series, BraveStarr in 3-D, also began under Blackthorne Publishing in January 1987.

Video game
A BraveStarr video game was released for Commodore 64, Amstrad CPC, and ZX Spectrum in 1987. It is a side-scrolling shooter game.

Home releases
BraveStarr made its way to VHS in compilations such as Filmation All-Star Theatre and Sampler Collection. Individual episodes of the series found their way to shelves as late as 1989.

BCI Eclipse Entertainment (under its Ink & Paint classic animation entertainment label) (under license from Entertainment Rights) released the entire series on DVD in Region 1 for the very first time in 2007/2008. Each episode on BCI Ink & Paint's DVD releases of BraveStarr was uncut, digitally remastered and fully restored for optimum audio and video quality and presented in its original broadcast presentation and story continuity order. The series was released in 2 volume sets, with the first volume featuring several bonus features.  , these releases have been discontinued and are out of print as BCI Eclipse ceased operations.

On December 10, 2010, Mill Creek Entertainment announced that it had acquired the rights from Classic Media to re-release the series on DVD in North America.  They subsequently released a complete series set as well as two single volume releases on May 10, 2011.

See also
 BraveStarr: The Movie
 The Adventures of the Galaxy Rangers
 Saber Rider and the Star Sheriffs

References

External links

BraveStarr.org
BraveStarr at Don Markstein's Toonopedia. Archived from the original on February 22, 2018.
Bravestarr Official on YouTube

1987 American television series debuts
1988 American television series endings
1980s American animated television series
1980s American children's television series
Action figures
American children's animated space adventure television series
American children's animated science fantasy television series
American children's animated action television series
Television series by Filmation
Television series by Universal Television
DreamWorks Classics franchises
Blackthorne Publishing titles
Western (genre) peace officers
Fictional Native American people
First-run syndicated television programs in the United States
Space Western television series
1980s American science fiction television series
1980s toys
Television shows based on Mattel toys
English-language television shows
Television series set on fictional planets
Western (genre) animated television series
1980s Western (genre) television series
Television series set in the 23rd century
Science fiction franchises
Television shows about Native Americans